The Merle Curti Award is awarded annually by the Organization of American Historians for the best book in American social and/or American intellectual history. It is named in honor of Merle Curti (1897–1996). A committee of 5 members of the Organization of American Historians chooses the winners from published monographs submitted by the author(s). Committee members represent the entire spectrum of American history and serve a one-year term. Beginning with the awards of 2004, the Committee may select 1 book "winner" in American intellectual history, 1 book "winner" in American social history, and may list other "finalists" in each field. "Winners" split a $1000 cash award.  Although not explicitly stated, "American" refers to the "United States of America" alone.

See also

 List of history awards

References

American literary awards
Awards established in 1977
History books about the United States
American history awards
1977 establishments in the United States